The 2019 Camping World 400, is a Monster Energy NASCAR Cup Series race that was held on June 30, 2019 at Chicagoland Speedway in Joliet, Illinois. Contested over 267 laps on the  intermediate speedway, it was the 17th race of the 2019 Monster Energy NASCAR Cup Series season. Alex Bowman won the race, recording his first career Cup Series victory, while Kyle Larson, Joey Logano, Jimmie Johnson and Brad Keselowski rounded out the top 5.

This was the last NASCAR race at Chicagoland, as the track lost all three of its 2020 race dates due to scheduling conflicts because of the COVID-19 pandemic.

Report

Background

Chicagoland Speedway is a  tri-oval speedway in Joliet, Illinois, southwest of Chicago. The speedway opened in 2001 and currently hosts NASCAR racing. Until 2011, the speedway also hosted the IndyCar Series, recording numerous close finishes including the closest finish in IndyCar history. The speedway is owned and operated by International Speedway Corporation and located adjacent to Route 66 Raceway.

Entry list
 (i) denotes driver who are ineligible for series driver points.
 (R) denotes rookie driver.

Practice

First practice

Final practice

Qualifying

Qualifying results

 Note: Matt Tifft started at the back due to failing inspection

Race

Stage results

Stage One
Laps: 80

Stage Two
Laps: 80

Final stage results

Stage Three
Laps: 107

Race statistics
 Lead changes: 23 among 13 different drivers
 Cautions/Laps: 5 for 25
 Red flags: 1 for 3 hours, 18 minutes and 26 seconds
 Time of race: 2 hours, 50 minutes and 49 seconds
 Average speed:

Media

Television
NBC Sports covered the race on the television side. Rick Allen, Jeff Burton, Steve Letarte and 2005 race winner Dale Earnhardt Jr. had the call in the booth for the race. Dave Burns, Parker Kligerman, Marty Snider and Kelli Stavast reported from pit lane during the race.

Radio
The Motor Racing Network had the radio call for the race, which was simulcast on Sirius XM NASCAR Radio.

Standings after the race

Drivers' Championship standings

Manufacturers' Championship standings

Note: Only the first 16 positions are included for the driver standings.
. – Driver has clinched a position in the Monster Energy NASCAR Cup Series playoffs.

References

Camping World 400
Camping World 400
NASCAR races at Chicagoland Speedway
Camping World 400